Rho GTPase-activating protein 5 is an enzyme that in humans is encoded by the ARHGAP5 gene.

Function 

Rho GTPase activating protein 5 negatively regulates RHO GTPases, a family that may mediate cytoskeleton changes by stimulating the hydrolysis of bound GTP. Two transcript variants encoding different isoforms have been found for this gene.

Interactions 

ARHGAP5 has been shown to interact with Rnd1, Rnd2, Rnd3 and RHOA.

References

External links

Further reading